The 1910 All-Ireland Senior Football Championship was the 24th staging of Ireland's premier Gaelic football knock-out competition. Louth were the winners, receiving a walkover from Kerry in the final.

Format
The four provincial championships were played as usual; the four champions joined  in the All-Ireland championship.

Results

Connacht Senior Football Championship

Leinster Senior Football Championship

Munster Senior Football Championship

Ulster Senior Football Championship

Game abandoned after the ball burst.

An objection was made and a replay ordered.

All-Ireland Senior Football Championship
By the time the semi-final was to be played, the Leinster championship was not finished, so Dublin were nominated to represent Leinster. When Louth beat Dublin in the Leinster final, they were given Dublin's place in the All-Ireland semi-final.

1 The final was scratched and Louth were awarded the championship after Kerry refused to travel to Dublin as the Great Southern and Western Railway would not sell tickets to their fans at reduced rates.

Championship statistics

Miscellaneous

 It was the only between (1907-2001) that there was a Quarter-final in the All Ireland Series & only year (1909-1974) London played.
 Louth win their first ever All Ireland title.

References